Blanche Lyon Pursuivant of Arms in Ordinary (sometimes Blanch Lyon) was an English office of arms created during the reign of King Edward IV.

The title was then taken from the white lion of the Mortimer Earls of March, one of King Edward's favourite royal badges. The title lapsed under Henry VII, but it was revived in 1537. Its status was then anomalous, for although John James was described as 'Our pursuivant' and was granted a salary by the Crown, he was expressly said to be with the Duke of Norfolk and in the College of Arms he was counted as an extraordinary. The title in this case clearly refers to the white lion rampant, which was at once arms, crest and badge of the House of Mowbray and which, with a crown about its neck, is now one of the Duke of Norfolk's supporters. Among the later incumbents a white lion was incorporated in the armorial insignia of Walker, and Rogers-Harrison.

In 1602, the office was made "extraordinary" for the appointment of Francis Thynne, before his promotion to Lancaster Herald of Arms in Ordinary that same year. Nicholas Charles held the post. John Philipot was created Blanche Lyon Pursuivant of Arms Extraordinary in 1613, and William Dugdale followed in 1638.

In 1784, Sir Isaac Heard had his step-son, Alexander Ochterlony, appointed Blanche Lyon. Ochterlony was the first of only two known American-born officers of arms in British history. The other was York Herald of Arms John von Sonnentag de Havilland

Holders of the office

See also
 Heraldry
 Officer of arms

References
Citations

Bibliography
 The College of Arms, Queen Victoria Street: being the sixteenth and final monograph of the London Survey Committee, Walter H. Godfrey, assisted by Sir Anthony Wagner, with a complete list of the officers of arms, prepared by H. Stanford London, (London, 1963)
 A History of the College of Arms &c, Mark Noble, (London, 1804)

External links
The College of Arms
CUHGS Officer of Arms Index

English offices of arms